In 2020, voters in the U.S. state of Oregon passed Ballot Measure 109, allowing the "manufacture, delivery and administration" of psilocybin, a naturally occurring psychedelic prodrug. While psilocybin remains illegal nationally, the passage of the law made Oregon the first U.S. state to legalize the drug. Per the law, psilocybin must be used for "personal development" and grown and administered in licensed environments. The ballot measure puts in place a two-year period for the government to determine regulations around the law's implementation, such as what credentials will be needed for someone to administer the drug.

The chief petitioners behind the bill were Sheri and Thomas Eckert, both therapists who had been working for years to legalize psilocybin because of its potential benefit for people struggling with conditions including depression, anxiety, and addiction. To get the initiative (called the Psilocybin Service Initiative, or Initiative Petition #34) on the November 2020 ballot, 112,020 signatures of support from Oregonians had to be collected. On November 3, 2020, Ballot Measure 109 was passed with support from 1.27 million Oregonians, or 55.75% of the vote (according to unofficial results from the Oregon Secretary of State in the days following the election).

Implementation
The Oregon Health Authority runs the Oregon Psilocybin Services program, which is creating regulations and issuing licenses for all aspects of the program.  They will begin accepting applications for licensure on January 2, 2023.  After that date, treatment providers who are licensed, using tested psilocybin from licensed suppliers, will be able to legally screen and treat individuals with psilocybin in Oregon.  The program posted draft regulations for public notice and comment in April, 2022. In the 2022 Midterm Elections, as a protest against the measure, a total of 102 incorporated cities and 25 counties in the state voted, temporarily or permanently, to prohibit psilocybin-related business from being conducted within specified areas.

See also
 List of Oregon ballot measures
 Psilocybin decriminalization in the United States
 Shroom House

References

External links

An early draft of the Act (which was later revised before the vote) on the Oregon Secretary of State's website

2020 Oregon ballot measures
Controlled substances in Oregon